Michaël Ngoy (born January 10, 1982) is a Swiss former professional ice hockey defenceman. He spent 20 seasons in the National League (NL) with 3 different teams.

Playing career
Ngoy previously played for Lausanne HC and HC Fribourg-Gottéron before signing for HC Ambrì-Piotta for the 2016-17 season. He signed an extension with the team on June 22, 2018 and signed a further extension with the team on April 24, 2019.

Ngoy retired from professional hockey following the 2020–21 season. He played 881 NL games over 20 seasons with Lausanne, Fribourg and Ambri-Piotta.

References

External links

1982 births
Living people
HC Ambrì-Piotta players
HC Fribourg-Gottéron players
Lausanne HC players
Neuchâtel Young Sprinters HC players
Sportspeople from Lausanne
Swiss ice hockey defencemen